Elaine may refer to:

Arts and entertainment 

 Elaine (opera), composed by Herman Bemberg
 "Elaine" (short story), 1945 short story by J. D. Salinger
 "Elaine" (song), by ABBA

Places 
 Elaine, Victoria, a town in Australia
 Elaine, Arkansas, a US city

People
 Elaine (given name), real people and fictional characters with the given name
 Elaine (legend), name shared by several different female characters in Arthurian legend, including:
 Elaine of Astolat
 Elaine of Corbenic
 Elaine (singer), South African singer

See also 

Elaine's, a New York City restaurant

 The Exploits of Elaine, 1914 film serial in the genre of The Perils of Pauline

 "Miss Elaine", song by Run–D.M.C. from the album Tougher Than Leather